Øvre Saltdal Church is a parish church of the Church of Norway in Saltdal Municipality in Nordland county, Norway. It is located in the village of Røkland. It is one of two churches for the Saltdal parish which is part of the Salten prosti (deanery) in the Diocese of Sør-Hålogaland. The red, wooden church was built in a long church style in 1938 using plans drawn up by the architect Andreas W. Nygaard. The church seats about 200 people.

History

A royal resolution from 27 August 1937 authorized the construction of a new church in the upper Saltdal valley. The church was built the following year in 1938.

See also
List of churches in Sør-Hålogaland

References

Saltdal
Churches in Nordland
Wooden churches in Norway
20th-century Church of Norway church buildings
Churches completed in 1938
1938 establishments in Norway
Long churches in Norway